Gangs is a 1988 Hong Kong film directed by Lawrence Ah Mon. It was Lawrence Ah Mon's debut feature film.

Cast and roles
 Ricky Ho Pui Tung
 Eleven Leung Sap Yat
 Ma Hin Ting
 Tse Wai Kit
 Karel Wong Chi Yeung
 Lee Ho Ban
 Chan Tsung

Reception
Film critic Paul Fonoroff wrote, "Gangs [was] a milestone in Hong Kong cinematic neorealism and one of the more affecting probes into the city's adolescent gang culture" and that the 2008 film Besieged City by Lawrence Ah Mon was its "21st-century sequel".

Awards and nominations
Gangs was nominated four times at the 8th Hong Kong Film Awards in 1989:
 Best Film
 Best Director - Lawrence Ah Mon
 Best New Performer - Ho Pui Tung
 Best Editing - Fo San, Kwok Keung and Lau Kwok Cheung

References

External links
 
 
Gangs at Hong Kong Cinemagic

Hong Kong action films
1988 films
Films directed by Lawrence Ah Mon
1988 directorial debut films
Films set in Hong Kong
1980s Hong Kong films